Satish Kumar Karunakaran (born 20 May 2001) is an Indian badminton player. In 2020, he played for the Chennai Superstarz in the Indian Premier Badminton League.

Achievements

BWF International Challenge/Series (1 title, 3 runners-up) 
Men's singles

Mixed doubles

  BWF International Challenge tournament
  BWF International Series tournament
  BWF Future Series tournament

External links

References 

Living people
2001 births
Indian male badminton players
21st-century Indian people